Avasthe (ಅವಸ್ಥೆ) is a 1987 Kannada political drama film directed and co-produced by Krishna Masadi and is based on the novel written by the acclaimed writer U. R. Ananthamurthy. The film starred Anant Nag in the lead role along with a host of real-time politicians like J. H. Patel, D. B. Chandre Gowda, M. P. Prakash and B. K. Chandrashekar in the key roles. Other pivotal roles were played by B. V. Karanth, M. Bhaktavatsala, Chandrashekhara Kambara, Archana and Bhargavi Narayan.

The film's score and songs were composed by Vijaya Bhaskar. The film upon release was critically acclaimed and won multiple awards at the Karnataka State Film Awards for the year 1987–88.

Cast 

 Anant Nag as Krishnappa Gowda
 M. P. Prakash as Maheshwaraiah
 M. Bhakthavathsala as Veeranna
 B. V. Karanth as Nameless Sanyasi / Sarpa Siddeshwarananda Swamiji
 J. H. Patel as Chandraiah
 Abdul Nazeer Sab as Reddy
 D. B. Chandre Gowda as Rehman
 Archana Vishwanath as Gowri Deshpande
 Padma Kumta
 Bhargavi Narayan as Krishnappa's Mother
 Lakshmi Chandrashekar as Seetha (Krishnappa's wife)
 B. K. Chandrashekhar as a man on the steps of Vidhana Soudha
 Rajavardhan
 Chandrashekhara Kambara
 G. V. Shivanand as Annaji
 Sundar Raj as Channaveeraiah
 M. C. Anand
 B. S. Achar
 Narayan Rayachur
 Soumya Gowda
 Saroja Srishaila
 Lakshmi Nataraj

Soundtrack 
The music was composed by Vijaya Bhaskar. The audio was out on Lahari Music label.

Awards
Karnataka State Film Awards 1987-88
 Second Best Film
 Best Actor – Anant Nag
 Best Dialogue Writer – U. R. Ananthamurthy, Krishna Masadi

References

External links 
 Celluloid faithfully celebrated his novels
 Politician and Actor M.P. Prakash Passed Away

1987 films
1980s Kannada-language films
1980s political drama films
Films scored by Vijaya Bhaskar
Indian political drama films
Films based on Indian novels
1987 drama films